Alone is an American reality television series on the History channel. The first, second and fourth seasons were filmed on northern Vancouver Island, British Columbia, and the third near Nahuel Huapi National Park in Patagonia, Argentina. It follows the self-documented daily struggles of 10 individuals (7 paired teams in season 4) as they survive in the wilderness for as long as possible using a limited amount of survival equipment. With the exception of medical check-ins, the participants are isolated from each other and all other humans. They may "tap out" at any time, or be removed due to failing a medical check-in. The contestant (or team in Season 4) who remains the longest wins a grand prize of $500,000.

Series overview

Episodes

Season 1 (2015) – Vancouver Island

Season 2 (2016) – Vancouver Island

Season 3 (2016–17) – Patagonia

Season 4 (2017) – Vancouver Island

Season 5 (2018) – Northern Mongolia

Season 6 (2019) – The Great Slave Lake in the Northwest Territories in Canada near the Lutselk'e

Season 7 (2020) – The Great Slave Lake in the Northwest Territories in Canada near the Lutselk'e

Season 8 (2021) – Chilko Lake, British Columbia

Season 9 (2022) – Labrador

Specials

References

Lists of American reality television series episodes